I Love You is a 1986 French-Italian drama film directed by Marco Ferreri. It was entered into the 1986 Cannes Film Festival.

Cast
 Christopher Lambert - Michel 
 Eddy Mitchell - Yves
 Agnès Soral - Hélène 
 Anémone - Barbara 
 Flora Barillaro - Maria
 Marc Berman - Pierre
 Patrice Bertrand - The angry client
 Paula Dehelly - Pierre's mother
 Maurizio Donadoni - Georges
 Fabrice Dumeur - Marcel
 Carole Fredericks - Angèle
 Laurence Le Guellan - Nicole
 Jean Reno - The dentist
 Olinka Hardiman - The teacher
 Laura Manszky - Camelia / Isabelle
 Jeanne Marine - The prostitute

Awards
The film was selected to compete for the Palme d'or at the Cannes Film Festival, and was nominated for the Silver Ribbon at the Italian National Syndicate of Film Journalists.

References

External links

1986 films
1986 drama films
French drama films
Italian drama films
1980s French-language films
Films directed by Marco Ferreri
1980s French films
1980s Italian films